Ernest Procter  (22 March 1885–21 October 1935) was an English designer, illustrator and painter, and husband of artist Dod Procter. He was actively involved with the Newlyn School, partner of the Harvey-Procter School and an instructor at the Glasgow School of Art.

Personal life and education
Ernest Procter was born into a Quaker family in Tynemouth, Northumberland. His father, Henry Richardson Procter was an eminent scientist and a Leeds University professor who specialised in leather chemistry. He was also a Fellow of the Royal Society. Edward painted his father's portrait.

Procter, like his father, attended school first in York at the Quaker Bootham School. From 1907 to 1910 he was a student of Stanhope Forbes at the Forbes' School of Painting in Newlyn, Cornwall. He contributed to the school's publication, The Paper Chase in 1908 and 1909, was an assistant to Stanhope and Elizabeth Forbes, and was a successful, well-respected student. At Forbes' Procter met his future wife Doris "Dod" Shaw; They were "amongst the Forbes' star pupils."

In 1910 and 1911 Procter studied in Paris at Atelier Colarossi. Dod Shaw was also a student at Atelier Colarossi. Ernest and Dod were both influenced by Impressionism and Post-impressionism and the artists that they met in France, such as Pierre-Auguste Renoir and Paul Cézanne. In 1912 Procter married Dod at the church of Saint-Vincent-de-Paul, Paris. They had a son together named Bill and stayed in Paris until 1918.

Influential artists' works

In 1918 Procter and his wife returned to Newlyn, where they primarily lived from that point onward. On 21 October 1935, after years of high blood pressure, Procter died of a cerebral haemorrhage in North Shields, County Durham, while travelling.

First World War
During the First World War Procter was a conscientious objector, serving with the Friends' Ambulance Unit in Dunkirk from April 1916 until February 1919.

Career
After the war Dod and Ernest Procter returned to Newlyn, where Ernest was a member of the Newlyn Society of Artists. In 1920 Ernest and Harold Harvey established the Harvey-Procter School. They taught painting of still life, figures and landscapes in watercolour and oil. He and his wife, accepted a commission to decorate the Kokine Palace, Rangoon, in 1919 and 1920.

Procter created in 1931 what he called Diaphenicons, which were "painted and glazed decorations that provided their own light source." Leicester Galleries exhibited these works.

The Glasgow School of Art appointed him Director of Studies in Design and Craft in 1934.

Works
Procter's works included portraits and landscapes.

Paintings
 All the Fun of the Fair
 Aphrodite
 Delphiniums, 1907** Earth, Water, Fire, Air, 1928
 Feather leaves, 1934, a painted ceramic plate, Penlee House Gallery and Museum.
 Helston Flora Dance, 1926
 Mother & Child, 1924
 Malo Gate, Dunkirk, 1924
 Night and Evening
 Porthgwarra, oil on canvas, Penlee House Gallery and Museum.
 Rising Tide, 1936, Penlee House Gallery and Museum.
 Spring Hawthorn
 The Edge of the Shadow, 1921, for a Royal Academy Exhibition
 The Four Elements
 The Mischievous Boy
 The Road to Sancreed
 The Terrace, 1921
 The Zodiac, 1925, oil on canvas, Tate
 Those Who Dare
 Versailles, 1921

Portraits
 Sir Thomas Beecham, 2nd Bt
 Sir Thomas Beecham Conducting A Mass of Life at the Queen's Hall, 1929
Frederick Delius
 Group including Frederick Delius and Philip Arnold Heseltine
 Sir Landon Ronald

Church or other commissions
 St Mary's Church altar screen, Chapel Street, Penzance – which in 1985 was destroyed during a fire
 Kokine Palace decorations, Rangoon, 1920 with his wife Dod.
 St Hilary Church, Cornwall:
 Depicted St Mawes, St Kevin and St Neot for the St Hilary Church pulpit
 Reredos of the Altar of the Dead for the St Hilary Church
 Visitation, 1933, St Hilary Church
 Deposition, 1935, St Hilary Church
 Dod also made works for the St Hilary Church. Ernest and Dod's works are still on view at the church.

World War I
 Étaples, The Convoy Yard, 1918, pencil and watercolour, Imperial War Museum, Gift of the British Red Cross Society and Order of St John of Jerusalem, 1920
 Nissen Huts, St Omer, chalk and gouache, Imperial War Museum, Gift of the British Red Cross Society and Order of St John of Jerusalem, 1920
 The Interior of a Garage, Boulogne, pastel drawing, Imperial War Museum, Gift of the British Red Cross Society and Order of St John of Jerusalem, 1920
 The Interior of the BRCS and Order of St John Garage, Boulogne, pastel drawing, Imperial War Museum, Gift of the British Red Cross Society and Order of St John of Jerusalem, 1920

Book illustrations and other works
 Crowns Mine, Botallack, pencil drawing. Penlee House Gallery and Museum.
 In Newlyn (untitled). Penlee House Gallery and Museum.
 No Breakfast for Growler, 1901, book illustrations. Penlee House Gallery and Museum.
 Young Witches at Play in the Night Sky, pastel drawing. Penlee House Gallery and Museum.

Museums and galleries
His works are part of collections at the Imperial War Museum, Tate, Leeds, Newcastle, Penlee House Gallery and Museum, and Worthing / Adelaide.

Memberships
He was a member or affiliated to the following organisations:

 Associate of the Royal Academy (ARA), from 1932
 International Society of Sculptors, Painters and Engravers (IS), from 1925
 New English Art Club (NEAC), from 1929

 Newlyn Art Gallery (NAG), also called the Passmore Edwards Art Gallery, Newlyn, Cornwall
 Newlyn Society of Artists (NSA), Newlyn, Cornwall – member from 1924 to 34, trustee 1928 to 34

Exhibitions

Procter's work was exhibited:
 1904 +: Newlyn Art Gallery (NAG) – starting 1904, first sale 1909
 1913: Fine Art Gallery
 1916 +: International Society
 Leicester Galleries
 Royal Academy (49)
 Leicester Galleries (99)

Memorial exhibitions in 1936:
 Leicester Galleries
 Laing Art Gallery, Newcastle

Posthumous:
 1985: Painting in Newlyn 1900-1930, Newlyn Art Gallery (NAG) & Barbican Art Gallery
 1987: Looking West, Paintings inspired by Cornwall
 1989: A Century of Art in Cornwall, CCC centenary, Truro
 1990: Dod Procter RA and Ernest Procter ARA, Laing Art Gallery, Newcastle
 1992: Royal West of England Academy, Bristol: Artists from Cornwall

Gallery

Notes

References

External links

 
 Ernest Procter works
 Profile on Royal Academy of Arts Collections

People educated at Bootham School
19th-century English painters
English male painters
20th-century English painters
Newlyn School of Artists
1886 births
1935 deaths
Academics of the Glasgow School of Art
English Quakers
British conscientious objectors
People associated with the Friends' Ambulance Unit
Associates of the Royal Academy
20th-century English male artists
19th-century English male artists